The 1971 National Invitation Tournament was the 1971 edition of the annual NCAA college basketball competition.  1971 was unique because it was the only time that major rivals Duke and North Carolina had played each other after the ACC tournament until the 2022 NCAA Final Four clash.  Eventual ACC member Georgia Tech also made the semis, and lost to North Carolina in the championship. The fourth semifinalist, St. Bonaventure, was playing its first season following the departure of All-American Bob Lanier, who led the Bonnies to the 1970 Final Four.

Selected teams
Below is a list of the 16 teams selected for the tournament.

 Dayton
 Duke
 Georgia Tech
 Hawaii
 La Salle
 Louisville
 Massachusetts
 Michigan
 North Carolina
 Oklahoma
 Providence
 Purdue
 St. Bonaventure
 St. John's
 Syracuse
 Tennessee

Bracket
Below is the tournament bracket.

See also
 1971 NCAA University Division basketball tournament
 1971 NCAA College Division basketball tournament
 1971 NAIA Division I men's basketball tournament
 1971 National Women's Invitational Tournament

References

National Invitation
National Invitation Tournament
1970s in Manhattan
Basketball in New York City
College sports in New York City
Madison Square Garden
National Invitation Tournament
National Invitation Tournament
Sports competitions in New York City
Sports in Manhattan